Richard O. Papenguth (1903–1970) was an American college swimming coach at Purdue University and coach of the women's swim team in the 1952 Summer Olympics that won two bronze medals.

Papenguth was a graduate of the University of Michigan.  Papenguth is a member of the International Swimming Hall of Fame

External links 
International Swimming Hall of Fame Biography
Photo and Bio from University of Michigan Site

1903 births
1970 deaths
American swimming coaches
Purdue Boilermakers swimming coaches
Purdue University faculty
University of Michigan alumni